Eucalyptus paedoglauca, commonly known as the Mount Stuart ironbark, is a small to medium-sized tree that is endemic to a small area in Queensland. It has rough, dark ironbark, lance-shaped adult leaves, flower buds in groups of seven, white flowers and cup-shaped fruit. It is only known from a few hills near Townsville.

Description
It has rough dark grey to black ironbark to the thinnest branches. Flowering occurs from April to May and the flowers are white.

Taxonomy
Eucalyptus paedoglauca was first formally described in 1991 by Lawrie Johnson and Donald Blaxell from material collected on Mount Stuart, near Townsville. The description was published in the journal Telopea in a paper by Ken Hill and Johnson. The specific epithet (paedoglauca) is from ancient Greek, meaning "child" or "youth" and "pale blue or grey", referring to the glaucous juvenile leaves.

Distribution and habitat
Mount Stuart ironbark grows in remnant vegetation on Mount Stuart and a few other hills near Townsville.

Conservation status
This eucalypt is listed as "vulnerable" under the Australian Government Environment Protection and Biodiversity Conservation Act 1999 and by the Queensland Government Nature Conservation Act 1992. The main threats to the species are road maintenance and inappropriate fire regimes.

See also
List of Eucalyptus species

References

Trees of Australia
paedoglauca
Myrtales of Australia
Flora of Queensland
Plants described in 1991
Taxa named by Lawrence Alexander Sidney Johnson